Moses Jones is a British television crime drama series first broadcast on BBC Two in February 2009. The series was written by Joe Penhall, directed by Michael Offer and produced by Cameron Roach. The series follows DI Moses Jones (Shaun Parkes), a Scotland Yard detective who is seconded onto an enquiry investigating a mutilated body found floating in the Thames. The complete series was released on DVD on 9 March 2009.

Synopsis
The discovery of the bizarrely mutilated body in the Thames who seems to have been the victim of a ritualistic witchcraft killing sparks a wave of violence amongst London's Ugandan exile community. DI Moses Jones (Shaun Parkes) is seconded to the case from Scotland Yard due to his supposed cultural links with the local African community and assisted by young, hopeful DS Dan Twentyman (Matt Smith), he sets out to uncover the truth.

Jones and Twentyman find their investigations lead to the victim's niece Joy (Wunmi Mosaku) and her friend Solomon (Eamonn Walker) at the Afrigo Club where the ex-pat community go to unwind to the African beats of Solomon's band. As the investigation continues, the violence escalates and the evidence all seems to point towards Matthias Mutukula (Jude Akuwudike), a mysterious godfather figure rumoured to have both terror links and supernatural powers.

Forced to ask himself tough questions about his cultural identity, Moses Jones embarks on a frightening quest to track down his man and redeem himself before the community implodes... or takes revenge itself.

Cast
 Shaun Parkes - DI Moses Jones
 Matt Smith - DS Dan Twentyman
 Eamonn Walker - Solomon
 Wunmi Mosaku - Joy
 Femi Elufowoju Jr. - Peter
 David Fishley - Paul
 Jude Akuwudike - Matthias Mutukula
 Obi Abili - Joseph
 Indira Varma - Dolly
 Dennis Waterman - Frank Costello
 Tom Goodman-Hill - DCI Dick Catherwood
 Christianne Oliveira - Lita
 Ellen Thomas - Libby Jones
 Mark Oliver - Selwyn
 Shaun Dingwall - Roger Dankorth
 Struan Rodger - Father Fred Bone
 Lee Ross - Mick Mahoney
 Adam Kotz - Dr. Michael Michaels

References

External links
 
 

2000s British crime drama television series
2009 British television series debuts
2009 British television series endings
2000s British television miniseries
BBC television dramas
Television shows set in London
English-language television shows